The Leapmotor C11 is mid-size electric crossover SUV to be produced by Chinese electric vehicle startup company Leapmotor in 2021.

Overview

The Leapmotor C11 3-row mid-size electric SUV was revealed at the 2020 Auto Guangzhou show in December. The C11 will cost ¥160,000 to ¥200,000 and will be the third vehicle marketed by Leapmotor when it goes on sale in the Chinese market in 2021. Leapmotor plans to sell the C11 in Europe by 2022.

Specifications
The top version uses a 90 kWh battery and has a power output of 536 hp. The NEDC range is 550 km (342 mi). The vehicle is built on a Qualcomm Snapdragon 8155 platform. The C11 has three dashboard screens and 5 seats. Additional features in the C11 include Bluetooth connection, face recognition, adaptive personalized adjustment, a smart air purification system, and has 12 cameras for a 2.5D 360-degree panoramic view.

In the C11, Leapmotor uses their Lingxin 01, a chip that enables level 3 autonomous driving and self parking and combines usage with the Huawei Kirin A1 chip. Both chips enable the use of ADAS intelligent driving assistance.

Leapmotor C11 EREV
The C11 extended-range electric vehicle (EREV) was launched for the 2023 model year with an electric motor with a maximum power of 200 kW.  According to Leapmotor, the Leapmotor C11 EREV is equipped with a ternary lithium-ion battery pack with a capacity of 43.74 kWh supplied by CALB providing a CLTC range of 170 km on pure battery power. The C11 extended-range electric vehicle (EREV) has slightly longer and taller dimensions of 4,780 mm in length, and 1,675 mm in height.

Powertrain

Concept car

The Leapmotor C-More is an electric mid-size SUV concept introduced at the 2019 Shanghai Auto Show that previewed the C11 production model, which retains many design cues of the concept. Unlike the C11, the C-More has suicide doors. Leapmotor explained that the name "C-More" means "see more". The interior has a 8-inch HUD and a 15-inch multimedia display.

References

2010s cars
Cars introduced in 2020
Cars of China
Production electric cars
C11